Ragon Perera (born 19 May 1985) is a Sri Lankan cricketer. He made his first-class debut for Panadura Sports Club in Tier B of the 2018–19 Premier League Tournament on 9 May 2019.

References

External links
 

1985 births
Living people
Sri Lankan cricketers
Panadura Sports Club cricketers
Place of birth missing (living people)